"My Mother Is a Space Cadet" is the first single by Dweezil Zappa, released in 1982.  The song was co-written by sister Moon Zappa and Steve Vai.  Dweezil was 12 years old at the time of the recording, sister Moon Zappa was 14. The back of the single features a picture of the band, which included Greg Kurstin who would go on to become a famous producer and songwriter. The track was co-produced by Eddie Van Halen (credited as "The Vards", a pun on his mother's pronunciation of his first name Edward), who also plays the (uncredited) slide guitar that opens the song.

Track listing
"My Mother Is a Space Cadet" (D. Zappa, M. Zappa, S. Vai)
"Crunchy Water" (D. Zappa, Greg Kurstin)

References

Dweezil Zappa songs
1982 singles
Songs written by Steve Vai
1982 songs